Ixhuatán may refer to:

Santa María Ixhuatán, Santa Rosa department, Guatemala
Ixhuatán, Chiapas, Mexico
San Francisco Ixhuatán, Oaxaca, Mexico